Edílson José da Silva (born 8 December 1978) is a Brazilian former footballer who played as a striker.

Career statistics

Club

Honours
Individual
 Lebanese Premier League Best Player: 2003–04
 Lebanese Premier League Team of the Season: 2003–04

References

External links
 
 Edílson at playmakerstats.com (English version of ogol.com.br)

1978 births
Living people
Olympic Beirut players
Expatriate footballers in Lebanon
Brazilian footballers
Brazilian expatriate footballers
Al Ansar FC players
Lebanese Premier League players
Avispa Fukuoka players
Paraná Clube players
Clube Atlético Sorocaba players
Rio Branco Esporte Clube players
J2 League players
Brazilian expatriate sportspeople in Lebanon
Expatriate footballers in Japan
Association football forwards